Siberia is the tenth studio album by Echo & the Bunnymen. It was released on 20 September 2005 and received mixed reviews and was consequently the band's first album to not enter into the UK Top 75 Albums Chart.

The track "Of a Life" has the line "I want a song to learn and sing", which name-checks the band's 1985 compilation album Songs to Learn and Sing.

Reception

At Metacritic, which assigns a normalised rating out of 100 to reviews from mainstream critics, Siberia received an average score of 66, based on 17 reviews, indicating "generally favorable reviews".

Track listing
All tracks written by Ian McCulloch and Will Sergeant.
"Stormy Weather" – 4:24
"All Because of You Days" – 5:44
"Parthenon Drive" – 5:11
"In the Margins" – 5:06
"Of a Life" – 3:44
"Make Us Blind" – 4:00
"Everything Kills You" – 4:17
"Siberia" – 4:56
"Sideways Eight" – 3:16
"Scissors in the Sand" – 5:29
"What If We Are?" – 5:09

Personnel
Echo & the Bunnymen
Ian McCulloch - guitar, vocals
Will Sergeant - lead guitar
with:
Peter Wilkinson - bass
Paul Fleming - keyboards
Simon Finley - drums
Hillary Browning - cello on "Everything Kills You" and "What If We Are?"
Kate Evans, Martin Richardson - violin on "Everything Kills You" and "What If We Are?"
John Robert Shepley - viola on "Everything Kills You" and "What If We Are?"
Mimi McCulloch - tambourine on "In the Margins"

References

External links
 

2005 albums
Echo & the Bunnymen albums
Albums produced by Hugh Jones (producer)
Cooking Vinyl albums

sv:Siberia